

The Letov Š-32 was an airliner produced in small numbers in Czechoslovakia during the 1930s. It was a trimotor monoplane with a high, cantilever wing, and was designed to meet a requirement by ČSA for a machine to service a night route between Prague, Bratislava, Uzhorod, and Bucharest. It could carry up to six passengers in a fully enclosed cabin which was praised at the time as being "particularly roomy and lofty". The wings were of all-metal construction, and the fuselage was built up from steel tube and was mostly skinned in metal, other than its very rear part, which, like the empennage, was fabric-covered.

ČSA bought and operated five of these machines. On 26 June 1934, one of these (registered OK-ADB) crashed during final approach to Karlovy Vary, killing all three on board, most notably the famous Austrian actor Max Pallenberg.

Specifications

Notes

References

 
 
 
 

1930s Czechoslovakian airliners
Letov aircraft
Trimotors
High-wing aircraft
Aircraft first flown in 1931